Fwe, or Chifwe, is a Bantu language spoken by 10,000 people along the Okavango River in the Zambezi region of Namibia and in the Western Province in Zambia.  It is closely related to Kuhane, and is one of several Bantu languages of the Okavango which have click consonants.

Although under the pressure of Lozi and Kuhane (Subiya), Fwe speakers tend to have a positive attitude towards Fwe, and speaking Fwe is often considered an important part of one's identity, and thus underscores the vitality of the language.

Regional variation
Main phonological differences between Zambian and Namibian Fwe, as noted by both the speakers and seen in the data:

Morphological differences between Zambian and Namibian Fwe:

Phonology

Consonants
{| class=wikitable style=text-align:center
|+ Consonant inventory of Fwe
|-
! colspan=2|
! Bilabial
! Dental/Labiodental
! Alveolar
! Postalveolar/Palatal
! Velar
! Glottal
|-
! rowspan=2| Click
! plain
|
|  
|
|
|
|
|-
! prenasalized
|
|  
|
|
|
|
|-
! colspan=2| Nasal
| 
|
| 
| 
| 
|
|-
! rowspan=3| Stop
! voiceless
| 
|
| 
|
| 
|
|-
! voiced
| 
|
| 
|
| 
|
|-
! prenasalized
|   
|
|   
|
|   
|
|-
! rowspan=3| Fricative
! voiceless
|
| 
| 
| 
|
| 
|-
! voiced
| 
| 
| 
| 
|
|
|-
! prenasalized
|
|  
|  
| 
|
|
|-
! rowspan=2| Affricate
! plain
|
|
|
| 
|
|
|-
! prenasalized
|
|
|
|  
|
|
|-
! colspan=2| Tap
|
|
| 
|
|
|
|-
! colspan=2| Glide
|
|
|
| 
| 
|
|}

 The plosives  are considered peripheral phonemes, as they are relatively infrequent in the lexicon. They are not reflexes of *p, *b, *d and *g as reconstructed for Proto-Bantu, but mainly appear in loanwords.
 Though there are numerous cases where /h/ contrasts with zero, i.e. where /h/ can-not be omitted, [h] is also often used as an epenthetic consonant, in which case it freely commutes with [w], [j] and zero. Phonemic , on the other hand, cannot commute with a glide nor can it be dropped.

Vowels
Fwe has five contrastive vowel phonemes: .

References

 
 

Subia languages
Languages of Namibia
Click languages